Sahnaya (also spelled Sihnaya or  Sehnaya) is a town in southern  Syria, administratively part of the Rif Dimashq Governorate, located southwest of Damascus in the western Ghouta. Nearby localities include Ashrafiyat Sahnaya, Darayya, Muadamiyat al-Sham, Jdeidat Artouz, Khan Danun and Al-Kiswah. According to the Syria Central Bureau of Statistics, Sahnaya had a population of 13,993 in the 2004 census. The town is also the administrative center of the Sahnaya nahiyah consisting of two towns with a combined population of 44,512. Sahnaya is one of the few towns in the Ghouta with a majority Druze community, along with Jaramana, Ashrafiyat Sahnaya and Deir Ali.

History 
Sahnaya's residents are predominantly Druze and Greek Orthodox. The cavern of St. Paul near the town was supposedly the hiding place of Paul the Apostle when he was pursued in Damascus.

In 1838, Eli Smith noted Sahnaya as being located in the Wady el-'Ajam, and being populated with Druze and "Greek" Christians.

A former Greek Orthodox Metropolitan of Argentina, Malatios Alsweti, comes from Sahnaya.
The town is also known for its old olive trees, some of which are  around 500 years old.

Geography and population 
Sahnaya has a rural population and a hot climate. Most houses are simple; they are mostly made of cement because it is located in Damascus, one of the oldest cities in the world. Recently, due to the Syrian civil war, Sahnaya has hosted tens of thousands of the inhabitants of neighbouring Darayya and Al-Sabinah, who are mainly Sunni Muslims.
The town has a church named after Saint Elijah and a Druze majlis (religious council).

Climate 
In Sahnaya, there is a local steppe climate. Rainfall is higher in winter than in summer. The Köppen-Geiger climate classification is BSk. About  of precipitation falls annually.

References

Bibliography 

Populated places in Darayya District
Towns in Syria
Druze communities in Syria